is a passenger railway station located in the city of Fuchū, Tokyo, Japan, operated by the private railway operator Seibu Railway.

Lines

Station layout
The station has one ground-level island platform, serving two tracks, connected to the station building by a level crossing.

Platforms

History

Station numbering was introduced on all Seibu Railway lines during fiscal 2012, with Shiraitodai Station becoming "SW04".

Passenger statistics
In fiscal 2019, the station was the 77th busiest on the Seibu network with an average of 6,439 passengers daily. 

The passenger figures for previous years are as shown below.

Surrounding area
Tama Cemetery

References

External links

 Shiraitodai Station information (Seibu Railway) 

Railway stations in Japan opened in 1917
Railway stations in Tokyo
Seibu Tamagawa Line
Fuchū, Tokyo